UFC 89: Bisping vs. Leben was a mixed martial arts event held by the Ultimate Fighting Championship (UFC) on October 18, 2008, at the National Indoor Arena in Birmingham, United Kingdom.

Background
The event was headlined by a middleweight bout between Michael Bisping and Chris Leben. After the event, Leben tested positive for Stanozolol, a banned substance. He was suspended for a period of 9 months and fined one third of his purse. Leben admitted he had used the substance several months prior to the fight, but stated he had assumed it would have been out of his system by then.

This event aired live in Great Britain and Ireland on Setanta Sports and via tape delay in the United States and Canada on Spike TV. It also aired live via Rogers Sportsnet in Canada. The broadcast drew an average of 2.6 million viewers and peaked with 3.4 million viewers on Spike TV.

Lyoto Machida was scheduled to face fellow undefeated light heavyweight Thiago Silva, but a back injury forced Silva to withdraw from the fight. The fight was rescheduled for UFC 94.

Results

Bonus awards
All fighters were awarded an extra $40,000.

Fight of the Night: Chris Lytle vs. Paul Taylor
Knockout of the Night: Luiz Cane
Submission of the Night: Jim Miller

See also
 Ultimate Fighting Championship
 List of UFC champions
 List of UFC events
 2008 in UFC

References

External links
UFC 89 Event Site
UFC 89 Fight Card

Ultimate Fighting Championship events
2008 in mixed martial arts
Mixed martial arts in the United Kingdom
Sport in Birmingham, West Midlands
2008 in England
2000s in Birmingham, West Midlands